"Other People's Houses" is the second episode of the 1959 Australian TV drama anthology Shell Presents. It was based on a play by Tad Mosel and starred Diana Perryman and was directed by David Cahill.

The script had previously been filmed in the US for Goodyear Playhouse, with Rod Steiger and Eileen Heckart.

Plot
An old man (Lou Vernon) lives with his married daughter and her husband and they do not like him. His eldest daughter, Inez, moves in with them, and tries to save her father from an old person's home.

Cast
Lou Vernon as the old man
Diana Perryman as Inez, the eldest daughter
Coralie Neville as the married daughter
Deryck Barnes her husband Ralph
Fred Powell as a policeman

Production

ATN-7 originally announced that the second episode of Shell Presents would be an adaptation of Children of the Sun by Morris West but that was not made. In April 1959 it was announced the second episode would be Other People's Hoses.

Rehearsals began in April 1959. It was Carolie Neville's TV debut.

The production was shot at ATN 7's studio in Epping, Sydney. The complete interior of a "typical American middle class home" was built and the action was shot with three characters. Producer Brett Porter and director David Cahill spent a week going through the script to plan the presentation and the shooting pattern. There were three weeks of rehearsals and two hours of dress rehearsals. There were two rehearsals the day of the performance.

The design of the house was done in the American style. Vernon Best, operations manager for ATN, said that because the play was an intimate family drama, its setting had to be absolutely accurate. "We cannot have one false note," he said. "We have to take special care with furnishings."

Coralie Neville, one of the cast, said: "It's a brilliant play, and it's so much like life itself that we won't be able to act the people in it. We will have to be the people."

Reception

A spokesman for ATN Channel 7 said the phoned lines were "choked with congratulatory calls" from "all parts of Sydney" immediately after production finished.

The TV critic for the Sydney Morning Herald said the "director and cast... did not fully exploit the emotional possibilities of the ugly little domestic situation examined by the author in slick, oversimple terms. Technically fluent and firm in accents, but always rather cheap in set decoration, the production ran smoothly through its story."

See also
List of television plays broadcast on ATN-7

References

External links
 
 
 "Other People's Houses" at National Film and Sound Archive

Black-and-white television episodes
1959 Australian television episodes
Shell Presents
1959 television plays
1950s Australian television plays